Ashbourne Hall is a Manor house originally built by the Cockayne family in the 13th century in Ashbourne, Derbyshire. The present building is part of a largely demolished, Georgian-styled hall built in the 18th century.

The Cockayne family

The Cockayne family settled in Ashbourne in the 12th Century as lords of the manor. The Cockayne family's Ashbourne Hall was built during the reign of Henry III in the 13th century. Ashbourne Hall served as their family seat and most of the family were buried in the Cockayne Chapel at nearby Ashbourne Parish Church. The family also owned the nearby manors of Sturston Hall, Bradley and of Pooley hall in Polesworth, Warwickshire. Sir Aston Cockayne, First Baronet Cockayne of Ashbourne, was a cavalier, author and poet. He was friends with Charles I from whom he received his baronetcy for support during the civil war. Sir Aston used the hall as a dower house for his mother, Anne. He lived at his manor of Pooley hall for most of the English Interregnum, joining Charles II in exile for a short time. Sir Aston gained enormous debts and sold Ashbourne Hall in 1671 to Sir William Boothby in order to pay his creditors.

The Boothby family

Sir William Boothby bought the hall in 1671 and his family lived there until the mid-19th century. The hall was modified when additional land was included for Brooke Boothby which was the same year as the Scots arrived. 
In 1745, Bonnie Prince Charlie stayed at Ashbourne Hall for the night, proclaiming his father as James III in Ashbourne Market.

Sir Brooke Boothby, 6th Baronet married in 1784 and leased the hall from his father. He began the restoration of Ashbourne Hall using his wife's dowry to renovate the structure, remodel the parkland, purchase rare plants and obtain works of art. Boothby, like his father before him, was extravagant. He purchased from Joseph Wright of Derby two paintings of Dovedale, two views of nearby Matlock, two paintings of bridges in Rome as well as an unusual portrait of himself.

The original hall was demolished during the Boothby's time, and replaced by the present Georgian structure. The land that Brookby incorporated into the halls's lands meant that a road called Cockayne Avenue had to be closed. It was long after the 6th baronet Sir Brooke Boothby lost his young daughter and died broken hearted, that the road was returned to public use (in 1922).

Later
In 1846, on the death of Sir William Boothby, 9th baronet, the hall was put up for auction in London. Although bidding finished at £27,950 (£1,232,595 today) this was not enough to persuade the owners to sell.

The Hall was sold to Robert Hayston Frank, a solicitor, in 1861. He later became a magistrate and lived there with his family until his death in 1883. He is buried at the Hall. His widow sold the property for 48,000 plus pounds. Documented by probate documents for Derbyshire in 1883. Death date is May 1, 1883.<National Probate Calendar Index of Wills and Administration 1858 to 1966>

The House was bought by a solicitor from Ashbourne, John Fox, who within two months had sold the estate off in 46 separate lots. After being briefly owned by a Roman Catholic priest from Ashbourne, the Hall itself was bought by Captain Holland who sold it in 1858.

The hall was used as a hotel around 1900. Parts of the hall were demolished, little remains today.

Today
The hall is owned by Ashbourne Selfcatering and can be rented as self-catering accommodation for tourists. The parkland opposite Ashbourne Hall was created for the Cockayne Family in the early Tudor period, for hunting. It was developed in the late 18th century by the Boothbys into an ornamental park of around 40 acres. Today, what little remains of the Park land is used as a public park and the site of the Ashbourne War Memorial Gates.

See also

Boothby baronets
Cockayne baronets

References 

Country houses in Derbyshire
Ashbourne, Derbyshire